Mark Reed is a British ice dancer. He won the 1977 World Junior Figure Skating Championships with partner Wendy Sessions. He won the 1981 Nebelhorn Trophy with partner Karen Roughton.

References

Navigation

Living people
Year of birth missing (living people)
British male ice dancers
World Junior Figure Skating Championships medalists